William "Willy" le Maire de Warzée d'Hermalle (7 March 1879 –1966) was a Belgian tennis player. He has been named as among the best male tennis players in Belgian history.

Le Maire de Warzée d'Hermalle reached the quarterfinals of Wimbledon in 1904 and 1908.

Le Maire de Warzée d'Hermalle was born into the Belgian nobility, the son of Marie-Léon-Hubert le Maire Warzée d'Hermalle (born 1848) and Noëmie Constance Caroline Georgine Valérie de Warzée d'Hermalle (born in Beaufays in 1850). His elder brother, Marie-Georges-Gérard-Léon le Maire de Warzée d'Hermalle, Baron de Warzée d'Hermalle (1877–1931), was a diplomat and Belgian ambassador to Iran, Japan and China, who married Dorothy Hall, daughter of Irish writer Owen Hall.

References

External links
 
 
 

Belgian male tennis players
1877 births
1966 deaths
Date of death missing
Place of death missing
Belgian nobility
Sportspeople from Liège